The Midnight Sun Film Festival is an annual five-day film festival in Sodankylä, Finland. The festival usually takes place in the second week of June, but from June 14 to 18 in 2017. One of the main characteristics of the festival is to show films without a break around the clock while the sun shines around the clock.

The Midnight Sun Film Festival is non-competitive. The program consists mostly of films directed by the main guests, 20–30 modern movies from all parts of the world, contemporary Finnish films and cinema classics, some of which are usually presented as "master classes" by various film theory experts. Typically, the festival introduces 4–5 young directors who are also guests of the festival. In recent years, attendance has been between 15,000 and 25,000.

The festival was first arranged in 1986 and the first international director guests were Samuel Fuller, Jonathan Demme, Bertrand Tavernier and Jean-Pierre Gorin. Later on it hosted some of the biggest names in cinema, such as Jim Jarmusch, Krzysztof Kieślowski, Roger Corman, Terry Gilliam, Francis Ford Coppola, Abbas Kiarostami and Miloš Forman.

Guests 
Here follows the list of guests who have attended the festival since its first edition:

 1986: Samuel Fuller, Jonathan Demme, Bertrand Tavernier, Jean-Pierre Gorin
 1987: Michael Powell, Jacques Demy, Jim Jarmusch, D. A. Pennebaker, Juliet Berto, Thelma Schoonmaker
 1988: Monte Hellman, Paul Schrader, Dušan Makavejev, Aleksei German, Krzysztof Zanussi, Ali Özgentürk, Helle Ryslinge
 1989: Paul Morrissey, Krzysztof Kieślowski, Otar Ioseliani, John Berry, Vadim Abrashitov, Idrissa Ouedraogo
 1990: Richard Fleischer, Manoel de Oliveira, Ettore Scola, Jean-Pierre Léaud, Octávio Bezerra
 1991: Andre De Toth, Laslo Benedek, Alberto Lattuada, Jean-Charles Tacchella, Agnès Varda, Chantal Akerman, Enzo Serafini, Etienne Chatiliez
 1992: Roger Corman, Claude Chabrol, Jan Troell
 1993: Joseph H. Lewis, Dino Risi, Jerzy Kawalerowicz, Julio Medem
 1994: Robert Wise, Mario Monicelli, Luis García Berlanga, Stanley Donen, John Sayles
 1995: Robert Parrish, Agnieszka Holland, Maud Linder, Richard Price, Fridrik Thór Fridriksson, Victor Erice
 1996: Jean Dréville, Claude Sautet, Danièle Dubroux, Robert Boyle, Doris Dörrie
 1997: Gianni Amelio, Vincent Sherman, Jerzy Skolimowski, István Szabó, Costas Ferris
 1998: Youssef Chahine, Terry Gilliam, Robby Müller, Stefan Jarl, Wim Wenders, Leonard Kastle
 1999: Edgardo Cozarinsky, Costa-Gavras, Francesco Rosi, Angela Winkler, Murali Nair
 2000: Bob Rafelson, Paolo Taviani, Ivan Passer, Shinji Aoyama
 2001: Freddie Francis, Sergio Sollima, Jerry Schatzberg, Agnès Jaoui
 2002: Francis Ford Coppola, Miklós Jancsó, Fernando Solanas, Denys Arcand, Luce Vigo
 2003: Irvin Kershner, Emir Kusturica, Jean Rouch, Matti Kassila
 2004: Val Guest, Nanni Moretti, Marlen Khutsiev, Wolfgang Becker, Jörn Donner
 2005: Roy Ward Baker, Jean-Pierre Dardenne, Luc Dardenne, Yeşim Ustaoğlu, Juan Pablo Rebella, Pablo Stoll, Hans Weingartner
 2006: Gian Vittorio Baldi, Carroll Ballard, Andrei Smirnov, Jafar Panahi, Isabelle Stever, Mercedes Álvarez, Jasmine Trinca
 2007: Abbas Kiarostami, Claude Goretta, Vittorio De Seta, Giuseppe Bertolucci, Amos Gitai, Elia Suleiman, Pascale Ferran, Detlev Buck
 2008: Miloš Forman, Andrei Konchalovsky, Seymour Cassel, Lasse Pöysti, Veiko Õunpuu
 2009: John Boorman, Robert Guédiguian, Fatih Akin, Samira Makhmalbaf, Sergey Dvortsevoy, Andreas Dresen, Markku Lehmuskallio & Anastasia Lapsui
 2010: Pedro Costa, Terence Davies, Bahman Ghobadi, Vesa-Matti Loiri, Samuel Maoz
 2011: Michael Chapman, Souleymane Cissé, Atom Egoyan, Apichatpong Weerasethakul
 2012: Harriet Andersson, Joe Dante, Alan Rudolph, Béla Tarr
 2013: Philip Kaufman, Marco Bellochio, Claire Denis, Cristian Mungiu, Jem Cohen, Ahmet Boyacioglu
 2014: Olivier Assayas, Pawel Pawlikowski, Alain Bergala, Alice Rohrwacher
 2015: Malgorzata Szumowska, Miguel Gomes, Mike Leigh, Whit Stillman, Christian Petzold, Nils Malmros
 2016: Jiri Menzel, Fernando Trueba, Jonas Trueba, Bill Forsyth, Dagur Kari, Gianfranco Rosi, David Farr, Malin Buska
 2017: Carlos Saura, Bertrand Bonello, Per Fly, Kai Wessel, Hanna Schygulla
 2018: Barbet Schroeder, Bulle Ogier, Anja Kofmel, Katherina Wyss, Mahamat Saleh Haroun, Olivier Assayas, Thomas Stuber
 2019: Arnaud Desplechin, Fernando Meirelles, Johann Lurf, Kent Jones, Mark Jenkin, Marzieh Meshkini, Mohsen Makhmalbaf, Nora Fingscheidt, Pernilla August, Shahab Hosseini

Sodankylä Forever Documentary 
Co-founder of the festival, Peter von Bagh released a 4-hour documentary based on footage from panel discussions titled Sodankylä Forever. It features clips of various filmmakers discussing the broader impact of films and filmmaking within history and culture. Some of the directors that appear in the documentary include, Miloš Forman, Ivan Passer, Ettore Scola, Michael Powell, Abbas Kiarostami, Jafar Panahi, Elia Suleiman, Francis Ford Coppola, John Sayles, Samuel Fuller, Bob Rafelson and Jonathan Demme.

References

External links

 Midnight Sun Film Festival

Film festivals in Finland
Sodankylä
Tourist attractions in Lapland (Finland)
Recurring events established in 1986
1986 establishments in Finland
Summer events in Finland